The 1933 Trinidad hurricane was the easternmost tropical storm to form in the Main Development Region (MDR) so early in the calendar year on record and was one of three North Atlantic tropical cyclones on record to produce hurricane-force winds in Venezuela. The second tropical storm and first hurricane of the extremely active 1933 Atlantic hurricane season, the system formed on June 24 to the east of the Lesser Antilles. It moved westward and attained hurricane status before striking Trinidad on June 27. The storm caused heavy damage on the island, estimated at $3 million. The strong winds downed trees and destroyed hundreds of houses, leaving about 1,000 people homeless. Later, the hurricane crossed the northeastern portion of Venezuela, where power outages and damaged houses were reported.

After entering the Caribbean Sea, the hurricane maintained a northwest trajectory. It passed south of Jamaica on July 1, where heavy rainfall flooded roads and railways. The hurricane crossed western Cuba on July 3. High winds on the island destroyed hundreds of houses, and the storm's rainfall damaged the tobacco crop. It struck northeastern Mexico on July 8 and quickly dissipated. Upon its final landfall, the storm caused heavy damage in Mexico, and in southern Texas the storm ended a prolonged drought.

Meteorological history
A tropical wave was first observed near 40° W on June 23. The storm moved westward and gradually intensified, becoming a tropical storm farther east in the MDR at an earlier date than any other system before or since in the calendar year. After crossing the island, the hurricane struck the Paria Peninsula of northern Venezuela at the same intensity at 0200 UTC on June 28. The 1933 Monthly Weather Review summary of the season noted that the hurricane was the "earliest known in [the] general area also the only one in a record of nearly 50 years to pass south of the Island of Trinidad and over the northeast corner of Venezuela."

About two hours after striking Venezuela, the hurricane entered the southeastern Caribbean Sea. For the next few days it maintained its intensity while tracking to the northwest. The next day, the hurricane passed south of Jamaica and turned more to the west before resuming a northwest motion. It weakened while crossing the island, although it maintained hurricane status upon entering the Gulf of Mexico. On July 4, a strong high pressure area over the eastern United States turned the hurricane to the west. It maintained that intensity for about 18 hours, and during that time the hurricane turned to the southwest. At 0100 UTC on July 8, the hurricane made its final landfall near La Pesca, about halfway between Tampico, Tamaulipas and Brownsville, Texas. After moving ashore, the hurricane rapidly weakened over the high terrain of northeastern Mexico, and the storm dissipated at around 1200 UTC on July 8.

Impact
Throughout its path, the hurricane killed at least 35 people altogether in Trinidad, Venezuela, Jamaica, and Cuba. The hurricane first affected Trinidad, causing about $3 million in damage in the southern portion of the island. The storm destroyed 300 houses in one village, and thousands were left homeless. Trees across the island fell down and blocked many roads, including one that struck a car and seriously injured one man. Heavy damage was also reported to the cocoa industry. High winds destroyed about 60 oil derricks, and an  oil supply line was disrupted due to fallen trees. This represented a significant loss to the island's oil industry, one of two such events in the 1930s. High winds downed power lines across the island, which were repaired by three days after the storm struck. The storm also dropped heavy rainfall and destroyed the roofs of many houses. Little damage occurred in the capital city of Port of Spain. There were 13 deaths in Trinidad, some of whom drowned after their boats sank. After the storm, medical assistance and relief supplies were sent via boat to Cedros, which was one of the most significantly affected areas.

After affecting Trinidad, the hurricane struck northeastern Venezuela, where damage was heaviest in Carúpano, Río Caribe, and Isla Margarita. High winds cut telephone and telegraph lines for several days. The storm destroyed several houses and fishing boats, resulting in several million bolívares in damage. Officials reported that there were "a number of lives lost" due to the hurricane.

After moving across the Caribbean, the hurricane affected Jamaica. High winds downed about 200,000 banana trees, while flooding in the western portion of the island affected roads and railways. Later, the hurricane crossed western Cuba, killing 22 people and causing $4 million in damage. The hurricane destroyed about 100 houses in Pinar del Río Province from the combination of strong winds and flooding from heavy rainfall. One person died after her house collapsed in the province. The rainfall caused four rivers to exceed their banks, and the storm-related flooding left serious damage to the tobacco industry. The storm also damaged crops in the region. High winds downed telephone and telegraph lines in western Cuba. After the storm, Cuban President Gerardo Machado utilized the military to assist in relief operations and prevent looting.

The threat of the storm prompted the United States Weather Bureau to issue southeast storm warnings for Key West, Florida. Light rainfall from the storm was reported in Miami. Before the storm made its final landfall, the Weather Bureau issued northeast storm warnings from Brownsville to Port O'Connor, Texas on July 5. That same day, a hurricane warning was also issued for Brownsville. The hurricane ultimately struck a sparsely-populated area of northeastern Mexico, causing several deaths and heavy damage in the country. High winds downed trees and power lines, and damaged the roofs of several houses. Along the beach near Tampico, high tides damaged coastal structures and flooded some cars. The effects extended into Texas, and Brazos Island, Port Isabel, and Port Aransas were flooded due to the storm surge. High tides damaged ten piers in Port Isabel, and there was damage to buildings along the coast. The storm damaged the cotton and fruit crops in south Texas from high winds and rainfall. Rains from the storm ended an extended drought in the Brownsville area.

See also

 List of South America tropical cyclones
 Hurricane Emily (2005) – An unusually strong July hurricane that developed in the deep tropics
 Hurricane Ivan – The southernmost major hurricane in the Atlantic basin on record
 Tropical Storm Bret (2017) – Earliest tropical storm to form in the Main Development Region (MDR) on record
 Hurricane Beryl (2018) – A compact hurricane that developed between the Lesser Antilles and Africa in July
 Hurricane Elsa – Second-farthest-east tropical storm to form in the MDR so early in the calendar year

Notes

References

Trinidad
1933 Trinidad
1933 Trinidad
1933 Trinidad
1933 Trinidad
1933 Trinidad
1933 Trinidad
1933 Trinidad